The Insider is a news website based in Kampala, Uganda that was established in 2014. It is incorporated under Goldcast Uganda Limited. The Insider's editorial focus is upon news reports and analysis, breaking news, business, politics, investigations and entertainment.

See also

 Media in Uganda

References

External links
 
 Uganda Government Orders Kabaka Mutebi to Appear in Court – The Insider. Buganda Watch. November 28, 2014.

Mass media in Kampala